Cunninghamella binarieae is a species of fungus in the family Cunninghamellaceae. It was described as new to science by mycologist Ru-Yong Zheng in 2001. It is closely related to Cunninghamella bertholletiae, with which it shares many similar morphological characteristics.

References

External links

Fungi described in 2001
Cunninghamellaceae